Danel, father of Aqhat, was a culture hero who appears in an incomplete Ugaritic text of the fourteenth century BCE at Ugarit (modern Ras Shamra), Syria, where the name is rendered DN'IL, "El is judge".

Tale of Aqhat
The text in Corpus Tablettes Alphabétiques [CTA] 17–19 is often referred to as the Epic of Aqhat. Danel was depicted as "judging the cause of the widow, adjudicating the case of the fatherless" in the city gate. He passed through trials: his son Aqhat was destroyed but apparently in the missing conclusion was revived or replaced by Danel's patron god, Rp'u, who sits and judges with Hadad and Astarte and was likely considered to be the equivalent of El.

The text was published and translated in 1936 by Charles Virolleaud and has been extensively analysed since then.

Danel and the Book of Ezekiel 
Three verses in the Book of Ezekiel (and ) refer to DNʾL which, according to the Masoretic Text, should be read as "Daniel". This notwithstanding, parallels and contrasts with Danel (without i) of the Book of Ezekiel, placed between Noah and Job and invoked as the very example of righteous judgement, first pointed out by René Dussaud in 1931, have led readers commonly to accept  or occasionally to reject  a degree of identification with Ugaritic Danel of the "Aqhat text", amounting virtually to the same figure. The three figures referred to in  — "Even if Noah, Danel and Job were in it..." — links the name with two non-Israelites of great antiquity. In , Danel is one noted for his wisdom in the prophecy addressed to the king of Tyre: "you are indeed wiser than Danel, no secret is hidden from you". The name "Danel" had a long tradition in Hebrew culture: he is supplied as the father-in-law of Enoch in the Book of Jubilees.

Texts in the Ugaritic language, a Canaanite tongue, may provide an important clue. The language was discovered by French archaeologists in 1928 and known only from texts found in the lost city of Ugarit (modern Ras Shamra), Syria. Ugaritic has been used by scholars of the Old Testament to clarify Biblical Hebrew texts and has revealed ways in which ancient Israelite culture finds parallels in the neighboring cultures. Ugaritic was "the greatest literary discovery from antiquity since the deciphering of the Egyptian hieroglyphs and Mesopotamian cuneiform." Literary texts discovered at Ugarit include the Aqhat Epic (or Legend of Danel) — all revealing a Canaanite religion.

Danel would fit the pattern of being an ancient non-Israelite like Job and Noah. Ezekiel's literary arrangement may also support this position. The hypothetical rebellious country, while a cipher for Israel, is not specifically named and could represent any ancient Near Eastern country. Ezekiel's audience is clearly enamored with non-Israelite myths (cf. Tammuz in ), and so they could easily be aware of King Danel's legendary virtues. Thus, Ezekiel's triad, if they were three ancient, righteous, non-Israelite men, would fit the pattern of Yahweh judging Israel to some degree by the nations around them. The connection is more plausible when one considers that Ezekiel alludes to Danel in an oracle against Tyre (Eze. 28), for the cultures of Ugarit and Tyre were both Canaanite. Danel also had a son and, like Job, was unable to deliver him from divine harm (cf. ).

Recent uses 
The name Danel has been given to one of the craters on Ganymede, a moon of Jupiter.

See also 
 Virtuous pagan

Notes

References 
 Coogan, M.D. Stories from Ancient Canaan (Philadelphia) 1978:27–47
 Day, John. "The Daniel of Ugarit and Ezekiel and the Hero of the Book of Daniel", Vetus Testamentum 30.2 (April 1980:174–184)
 Gibson, J.C.L. Canaanite Myths and Legends (Edinburgh) 1978.
 Herdner, Andrée. Corpus des tablettes cunéiformes alphabétiques découvertes à Ras Shamra-Ugarit, en 1929 à 1939 (Paris 1963) (CTA 17–19).
 Maralit, Baruch. The Ugaritic poem of AQHT: Text, Translation, Commentary (Berlin: de Gruyter) 1989. A highly idiosyncratic commentary and interpretation.
 Walton, John H. Ancient Israelite Literature in Its Cultural Context: A Survey of Parallels, "Personal Archives and Epics": Canaanite .2 (Zondervan) 1994:49.

External links 
 The Ugaritic poems of Keret and Aqhat: a bibliography As of 1998.

Levantine mythology
Characters in epic poems
Ugaritic language and literature
Clay tablets
Ugaritic texts
Heroes in mythology and legend
Book of Ezekiel
Book of Jubilees
Hebrew Bible people